Andżelika Czesławowna Borys (born 14 October 1973) is a Polish activist in Belarus. She was born in Grabyani - Hrodna district. She was the leader of the Union of Poles in Belarus.

Borys competed in bowling in the 2011 Summer World Polonia Games in Wrocław.

References

1973 births
Living people
People from Hrodna District
Union of Poles in Belarus
Polish language activists
Belarusian people of Polish descent
University of Białystok alumni